Darin Kabud (also Romanized as Darīn Kabūd) is a village in Azadlu Rural District, Muran District, Germi County, Ardabil Province, Iran. At the 2006 census, its population was 137, in 24 families.

References 

Towns and villages in Germi County